Assonance is a resemblance in the sounds of words/syllables either between their vowels (e.g., meat, bean) or between their consonants (e.g., keep, cape). However, assonance between consonants is generally called consonance in American usage. The two types are often combined, as between the words six and switch, in which the vowels are identical, and the consonants are similar but not completely identical. If there is repetition of the same vowel or some similar vowels in literary work, especially in stressed syllables, this may be termed "vowel harmony" in poetry (though linguists have a different definition of "vowel harmony").

A special case of assonance is rhyme, in which the endings of words (generally beginning with the vowel sound of the last stressed syllable) are identical—as in fog and log or history and mystery. Vocalic assonance is an important element in verse. Assonance occurs more often in verse than in prose; it is used in English-language poetry and is particularly important in Old French, Spanish, and the Celtic languages.

Examples
English poetry is rich with examples of assonance and/or consonance:

It also occurs in prose:

Hip hop relies on assonance:

It is also heard in other forms of popular music:

Assonance is common in proverbs:

Total assonance is found in a number of Pashto proverbs from Afghanistan: 
La zra na bal zra ta laar shta. "From one heart to another there is a way."
Kha ghar lwar day pa sar laar lary. "Even if a mountain is very high, there is a path to the top."

This poetic device can be found in the first line of Homer's Iliad: . Another example is Dies irae (probably by Thomas of Celano):

 Dies iræ, dies illa
 Solvet sæclum in favilla,
 Teste David cum Sibylla.

In Dante's Divine Comedy there are some stanzas with such repetition.

 così l’animo mio, ch’ancor fuggiva,
 si volse a retro a rimirar lo passo
 che non lasciò già mai persona viva.

In the following strophe from Hart Crane's "To Brooklyn Bridge" there is the vowel [i] in many stressed syllables.

 How many dawns, chill from his rippling rest
 The seagull’s wings shall dip and pivot him,
 Shedding white rings of tumult, building high
 Over the chained bay waters Liberty—

All rhymes in a strophe can be linked by vowel harmony into one assonance. Such stanzas can be found in Italian or Portuguese poetry, in works by Giambattista Marino and Luís Vaz de Camões:

 Giunto a quel passo il giovinetto Alcide,
 che fa capo al camin di nostra vita,
 trovò dubbio e sospeso infra due guide
 una via, che’ due strade era partita.
 Facile e piana la sinistra ei vide,
 di delizie e piacer tutta fiorita;
 l’altra vestìa l’ispide balze alpine
 di duri sassi e di pungenti spine.

This is ottava rima (abababcc), a very popular form in Renaissance, used in the first place in long epic poems.

 As armas e os barões assinalados,
 Que da ocidental praia Lusitana,
 Por mares nunca de antes navegados,
 Passaram ainda além da Taprobana,
 Em perigos e guerras esforçados,
 Mais do que prometia a força humana,
 E entre gente remota edificaram
 Novo Reino, que tanto sublimaram;

There are many examples of vowel harmony in French, Czech, and Polish poetry.

See also 
Alliteration
Literary consonance

References

Sources
Assonance, American Rhetoric: Rhetorical Figures in Sound
Assonance, Modern & Contemporary American Poetry, University of Pennsylvania
Definition of Assonance, Elements of Poetry, VirtuaLit

Further reading
 
 Roman Jakobson, Jennifer Rowsell, Kate Pahl (ed.), The Routledge Handbook of Literacy Studies, p. 427.
 Jan Mukařovský, John Odmark, Language, Literature and Meaning, p. 27.
 Kazimierz Wóycicki, Forma dźwiękowa prozy polskiej i wiersza polskiego, Warszawa 1960 (in Polish).

External links
 Examples of assonance in poetry.
 Examples and definition of assonance.
 Katarzyna Lesiak, Estetyka dźwięku, czyli instrumentacja dźwiękowa oraz jej praktyczna realizacja w poezji epickiej mistrzów łacińskiego heksametru: Lukrecjusza, Wergiliusza i Owidiusza, Katowice 2007 (in Polish).

Poetic devices